Blade: Trinity (Original Motion Picture Soundtrack) is the soundtrack to David S. Goyer's 2004 film Blade: Trinity. It was released on November 23, 2004 via New Line Records, serving as a sequel to Blade II: The Soundtrack. Composed of a mix of hip hop and electronic music, it consists of twelve songs, and features contributions by the likes of Wu-Tang Clan members and affiliates, Black Lab, E-40, Lil' Flip, Overseer, Paris Texas, The Crystal Method, Thee Undatakerz and WC. Production was handled by RZA, Ramin Djawadi, Andy Ellis and Danny Saber, with executive producers George Drakoulias and Wesley Snipes.

The album proved to be the least successful of the three Blade soundtracks, peaking at number 68 on the Top R&B/Hip-Hop Albums, number 15 on the Top Soundtracks and number eight on the Independent Albums.

Versions
There are three different versions of the soundtrack: the clean version, the uncensored version, and the deluxe version. The deluxe version includes a 12-page comic by Takashi Okazaki and a bonus DVD featuring an animated short, a story board animatic, making-of footage, character designs, Blade Manga art, a weapons gallery, behind the scenes footage of the RZA scoring the film, and more. The song "Starting Over" by The Crystal Method was also used in the film, though it is not on the soundtrack.

Track listing

Charts

References

External links

Blade: Trinity soundtrack at IMDb

2004 soundtrack albums
2000s film soundtrack albums
Hip hop soundtracks
Albums produced by RZA
WaterTower Music soundtracks
Albums produced by Danny Saber
Marvel Comics film soundtracks
Blade (franchise)